The 2016 Sukma Games, officially known as the 18th Sukma Games was a Malaysian multi-sport event held in Sarawak. This was Sarawak's second time to host the Sukma Games, and its first time since 1990.

The games was held from 23 to 31 July 2016, although several events had commenced from 19 July 2016. Around 5670 athletes from 13 states, Federal Territory and Brunei participated at the games which featured 382 events in 24 sports. The games was opened by Abdul Taib Mahmud, the governor of Sarawak at the Sarawak Stadium.

The final medal tally was led by Selangor, followed by host Sarawak and Terengganu. 6 national and 67 games records were broken during the games. Malaccan sprinter Khairul Hafiz Jantan and Terengganuan archer Nur Aqilah Yusof were announced as best sportsman and best sportswoman of the games respectively.

Host city

Sarawak was chosen to host the games in 2013 during a Ministry of youth and sports meeting chaired by Khairy Jamaluddin. It had previously hosted the 1990 Sukma Games where it emerged as overall champion.

Development and preparation
The Sarawak Sukma Games Organising Committee was formed to oversee the staging of the event.

Venues

The 2016 Sukma Games used a mix of new and existing venues. Most venues were existing public-sporting facilities, while others were newly constructed venues. Some retrofitting work were done in venues which are more than a decade old. They were reverted to public use after the games. Some had been used to host multi-disciplinary events such as the 1990 Sukma Games.

At the centrepiece of the activities was the upgraded Petra Jaya Sports Complex. Incorporating the 40,000-seat Sarawak Stadium, it hosts most of the events. A games village was not built, instead athletes and officials were housed in universities across Sarawak such as Universiti Malaysia Sarawak which was chosen to be the official games village. Besides being physically near to the competition venues, it was hoped that it will add vibe to the host cities and reduce post-games costs in converting a dedicated games village to other uses.

The 18th Sukma Games had 24 venues for the games: 17 in Kuching, 3 in Samarahan, 2 each in Miri and Sibu respectively.

Volunteers
The organisers estimated that about 4,000 volunteers between the age of 18 and 60 are needed to successfully host the games.

Countdown
The countdown to the games began on 22 July 2015 at the Baitul Makmur in Petra Jaya, Kuching during the press conference of the games to mark the one year countdown to the games. A launch party was held on 20 October 2015 at the Meritz Hotel in Miri in conjunction with the 2013 and 2014 Sarawak state sports awards where the logo, theme and mascots were introduced. Begin December 2015, Pre-Games tournaments were held across Sarawak for Sukma Games sports events.

Baton relay
A baton relay was held statewide, began with the town of Lawas on 13 February 2016 at 9 am (MST), passed through several cities in Sarawak and ends in Kuching on 23 April 2016.

Public transport
Shuttle bus services, Rapid KL Buses were provided throughout the games and were used to ferry athletes and officials to and from the airport, games venues and games village.

Marketing

Motto

The motto of the 2016 Sukma Games is "Unity in diversity". It was chosen to represent the unity of the athletes from the 14 states of Malaysia and Brunei, technical officers, assisting staffs and volunteers of the games of different races and backgrounds.

Logo

The logo of the 2016 Sukma Games is an image of a hornbill, the state bird of Sarawak. The hornbill on the logo and colours of the flag of Sarawak, red, yellow and black, represents Sarawak as host of the Sukma Games while the element of the sun of the logo represents the participating athlete's speed and agility.

Mascot
The official mascots of the 2016 Sukma Games is a pair of hornbills named Satria (male) and Satrina (female) respectively, which were designed by Amir Hassan Mohd Shah. It is said that Sarawak is known by many as "Bumi Kenyalang" or the "Land of the Hornbills" with the hornbills regarded as the symbol of the state. The adoption of Hornbills as the games' mascot is to represent the state of Sarawak as the games' host state.

Songs
The theme song of the games is "Berpadu Menyahut Cabaran" (United In Facing Challenges).

The games

Opening ceremony
The opening ceremony was held on Saturday, 23 July 2016, beginning at 20:30 MST (UTC+8) at the Sarawak Stadium. The ceremony began with Yang di-Pertua Negeri Abdul Taib Mahmud and his wife, Toh Puan Raghad Kurdi Taib entered the stadium in a buggy car and the playing of the national anthem of Malaysia and the state anthem of Sarawak. This was followed by a countdown performance, an opener performance combining light dance, laser projection technology and firework display with the theme beautiful Sarawak and Sarawak Sukma Games. Later, a parade of athletes led by the games volunteers was held, began with the invitational contingent, Brunei, followed by all the states of Malaysia with host Sarawak enters the stadium last. After sports minister Khairy Jamaluddin and the then Chief Minister Adenan Satem gave their respective speech, a baton relay by Sarawak famous athletes was held began with Ramli Ahmad of Pencak silat, Wong Tee Kui of athletics, Sapok Biki of boxing, Edmund Yeo of weightlifting, Mohamad Azlan Iskandar of squash, Daniel Bego of swimming, Bryan Nickson Lomas of diving, Assri Azri Marzuki of tennis, Watson Nyambek of athletics and Tania Bugo of swimming. After Abdul Taib Mahmud declared the games opened, Watson and Tania placed the baton on the pedestal to lit up the cauldron. After the cauldron was lit, the games flag was raised by Royal Malaysian navy personnel, followed by Bon Yusuf performing the games' theme song, Berpadu Menyahut Cabaran accompanied by violinist, Nisa Addina Mohd Taufik. This was followed by pledge recitation and dance performance by Kuching students with the theme "Unity in Diversity". The ceremony ended with a musical firework performance for 7 minutes.

Closing ceremony
The closing ceremony was held on Sunday, 31 July 2016, beginning at 20:30 MST (UTC+8) at the Sarawak Stadium. The ceremony begins with volunteers leading the athletes enter the stadium began with the invitational contingent, Brunei, followed by all the states of Malaysia with host Sarawak enters the stadium last. This was followed by the arrival of guests including Ahmad Zahid Hamidi, Khairy Jamaluddin and Adenan Satem, the playing of the national anthem of Malaysia and the state anthem of Sarawak. After a series of performance and Khairy gave his speech, Ahmad Zahid Hamidi gave his speech and declared the games closed. Later, Khairul Hafiz Jantan of athletics from Malacca and Nur Aqilah of archery from Terengganu were announced as best sportsman and best sportswoman respectively. Selangor was also announced as the overall champion of the games, beating host Sarawak. After the games flag lowered by Royal Malaysian Navy personnel and the cauldron extinguished, the Sukma Games responsibility was handed over to Perak, host of the 2018 Sukma Games where Zambry Abdul Kadir received the games flag as its symbolisation. A Perak segment performance was later performed by Perak dancers. The ceremony concludes with a series of cultural dances and firework performance.

Participating states
An estimated total of 5670 athletes from 13 states, Federal Territory and Brunei competed at the 2016 Sukma Games.

  (408 athletes)
  (358)
  (220)
  (307)
  (330)
  (412)
  (380)
  (498)
  (253)
  (431)
  (544)
  (507)
  (485)
  (478)
  (59)

Sports
The Sarawak Sukma Games Organising Committee had confirmed a total of 24 sports for the 2016 Sukma Games. The announcement took place after the sports were endorsed at the games countdown in Baitul Makmur, Petra Jaya.

 Aquatics 
 
 
 
 
 
 
 
 
 
 
 
  Hockey 
 
 
  Petanque

Calendar

Medal table
A total of 1238 medals comprising 385 gold medals, 380 silver medals and 473 bronze medals were awarded to athletes. The host Sarawak's performance was their best ever yet and were placed second only to Selangor as overall champion.

Broadcasting
Radio Televisyen Malaysia was responsible for live streaming of several events, opening and closing ceremony of the games.

Malaysian Paralympiad

6 to 10 August 2016.

References

External links 

 
 Sukma XVIII Sarawak 2016 - Tag Archive - Sports247.My

Sukma Games
2016 in Malaysian sport
2016 in multi-sport events
Sport in Malaysia